is the debut and only studio album from Japanese electronic music group Ravex, which consists of Shinichi Osawa (also known as Mondo Grosso), Tomoyuki Tanaka (also known as Fantastic Plastic Machine) and M-Flo's member Taku Takahashi.

Track listings

CD
 "I Rave U (Original)"
 "Rock U feat. Namie Amuro"
 "Just the Two of Us feat. Tohoshinki"
 "House Nation feat. Lisa"
 "Bangalicious feat. Anna Tsuchiya"
 "Believe in Love feat. BoA"
 " feat. Chisa (Girl Next Door)"
 "Golden Luv feat. Maki Goto"
 "V.I.P.P. (Very Important Party People) feat. TRF & Verbal (M-Flo)"
 "1 More Night feat. Monkey Majik"
 " feat. Yūko Andō"
 "I Rave U feat. DJ Ozma"

DVD
 "Ravex in Tezuka World" (Tezuka Productions Original Animation)
 "Believe in Love feat. BoA" (Music Video)
 "I Rave U feat. DJ Ozma" (Music Video)
 "Mega Ravex" (Original PV, "Ravex in Tezuka World")

References

2009 debut albums
Avex Group albums
Ravex albums